Ganj-e Badavard (New Persian:  Ganǰ-i Bādāward, literally "the treasure brought by the wind") was the name of one of the legendary eight treasures of the Sasanian king Khosrow II (r. 591-628) according to the majority of Persian sources. According to the Shahnameh, however, it was also the treasure of the legendary Kayanid king Kay Khosrow.

References

Sources 
 

Sasanian Empire
Iranian folklore
Shahnameh
Khosrow II